E-Ring is an American military drama television series created by Ken Robinson and David McKenna and executive produced by Jerry Bruckheimer, that premiered on NBC on September 21, 2005, and aired through February 1, 2006. The series stars Benjamin Bratt, Dennis Hopper, Aunjanue Ellis, Kerr Smith and Kelly Rutherford.

Series overview
The title of the show refers to the structure of The Pentagon, which is configured in five concentric rings, from "A" to "E", with E being the outermost ring.  Before any military action can be taken anywhere in the world, the mission must be planned and approved by the most important ring of the Pentagon, the E-ring.  This is where the more high-profile work is done, all operations must be legally approved and the green light given by the Joint Chiefs of Staff.  The show starred Benjamin Bratt as Major James Tisnewski, a former Delta Force operator and Dennis Hopper as Colonel Eli McNulty, as officers working in the E-ring of the Pentagon in the Special Operations Division (SOD) – planning and co-ordinating covert US special operations actions around the globe.

The show struggled from the onset because it was up against ABC's Top 20 hit Lost, CBS's Top 30 hit Criminal Minds, FOX's Top 10 hit American Idol and the network's other Top 30 hit Unan1mous. Although NBC gave it an earlier time slot which led to better ratings, the show was pulled from the lineup during the February sweeps and officially canceled at the NBC upfront on May 15.

Cast 
 Benjamin Bratt – Major James "JT" Tisnewski, a former Army Ranger and a Delta Force operator reassigned to the Joint Staff's Special Operations Division after 14 months in the Middle East.  Four years prior to the series, he was an Operational Detachments-A Captain (as seen in "Cemetery Wind").  He was promoted to lieutenant colonel in "The General" and was assigned as the SOD Liaison to Delta Force.  
 In "Acceptable Losses" (the series finale), after taking down a Mexican drug cartel leader who'd allegedly smuggled Al Qaeda operatives across the border on US soil, LTC Tisnewski was arrested and was last seen in pre-trial confinement at the United States Disciplinary Barracks in Fort Leavenworth, Kansas.
 Dennis Hopper – Colonel Eli McNulty, the principal staff officer of the Special Operations Division.  A Vietnam War veteran and former prisoner of war with two Silver Stars, COL McNulty is still sometimes a little old-fashioned when it comes to dealing with female personnel.
 In "Acceptable Losses" (the series finale), COL McNulty tendered his resignation after it was publicly revealed that the US Army used FISA warrants to spy on American citizens who had extremely loose or tangential ties to terrorists.
 Aunjanue Ellis – Master Sergeant Jocelyn Pierce, USMC, a career Pentagon non-commissioned officer who has worked as COL McNulty's aide for two years.  She is a widow; her husband Danny was killed in action.
 Kerr Smith – Captain Bobby Wilkerson, JT's former second-in-command who is now a Delta Force team leader.  He is married with two kids, but is rarely ever home due to his job. 
 Kelly Rutherford – Samantha "Sonny" Liston, the Deputy General Counsel of the Department of Defense, with whom MAJ Tisnewski has a past with.  She was later appointed the Assistant Secretary of Defense for Special Operations after the resignation of Assistant Secretary Algazi.

Recurring cast 
 Joe Morton – Steven Algazi, the Assistant Secretary of Defense for Special Operations who resigned after MAJ Tisnewski and his team stopped a terrorist attack at the Pentagon station.  He is a Marine veteran. (9 episodes)
 Maurice Compte – Sergeant First Class  Charlie Gutierrez, one of JT's teammates. (9 episodes)
 Tavis Bohlinger – Mark "Doc" Jones (8 episodes)
 Kelsey Oldershaw – Angie Aronson, MAJ Tisnewski's girlfriend and a CIA operative. (7 episodes)
 Ashley Williams – Beth Wilkerson, Bobby's wife. (6 episodes)
 Mitch Morris – Ken Watkins (5 episodes)
 Andrew McCarthy – Aaron Gerrity, the Assistant Secretary of Defense for International Security Affairs with aspirations of higher office. (5 episodes)
 Brittany Ishibashi – Ashley Nakahino (5 episodes)
 Robert Picardo - Larry Kincaid, a reporter who has been working at the Pentagon for over 20 years.  He was paralyzed during his time as a war correspondent during the Vietnam War. (4 episodes)
 Jaime Ray Newman – Nathalie Hughes, the daughter of General Hughes, the Commanding Officer of United States Special Operations Command, who begins a fellowship in Assistant Secretary of Defense Samantha Liston's office and a relationship with LTC Tisnewski. (4 episodes)

Episodes

Broadcast
E-Ring aired in the United Kingdom on FX, as of July 28, 2006. They have shown all 22 episodes filmed, and have repeated the series several times since the conclusion of the original run. It is also currently (as of July 2006) shown in Kanal 5 for the Swedish market and in La Sexta for the Spanish market. On September 8, 2006,Hong Kong's ATV began showing it.

In October, E-Ring aired on Premiere (a German pay TV company) starting on October 5 synced in German language as well as the original sound.  The show also aired on TVMax in (Panama) and on Rádio e Televisão de Portugal and is airing again on Fox. The show is also currently airing on the Israeli Cable channel XTRA Hot. The show was aired on Philippine cable channel Crime/Suspense. The show is also airing on SubTV (Finland). The show is also due to air on Nine HD (Australia) in April 2008. In Italy the show is due to air on Rai Due since March 21, 2008. In Croatia the show was aired on Croatian television HRT in September 2008, and again on RTL2 in September 2017. In July 2008 show started to air on Avala (Serbia).

The remaining episodes were shown on the Irish network TG4.

References

Citations

Sources

External links
 
 
 

2005 American television series debuts
2006 American television series endings
English-language television shows
Espionage television series
American military television series
NBC original programming
The Pentagon
Television series by Warner Bros. Television Studios